The Syro-Malabar Catholic Eparchy of Jagdalpur is an Eastern Catholic eparchy in India, under the Syro-Malabar Catholic Church. It came into existence when in 1977 it was raised to a diocese by Pope Paul VI by the Bull "Nobismetipsis" of 26 February, Mar Simon Stock Palathara CMI was ordained and installed as the second Bishop of Jagdalpur. On  2013 July 16, Pope Francis accepted the resignation of Mar Simon Stock Palathara, CMI and appointed Mar Joseph Kollamparampil as the new bishop.

References

External links
Catholic-Hierarchy entry

Syro-Malabar Catholic dioceses
Christian organizations established in 1977
Christianity in Chhattisgarh
1977 establishments in Madhya Pradesh